VIS Limunada (Serbian cyrillic: ВИС Лимунада) is a Serbian music group from Belgrade. They perform covers and original songs in the style of songs from the 1950s and 1960s.  
In 2022 they participated in Pesma za Evroviziju '22, Serbia's selection show for the Eurovision Song Contest, with the song 'Pesma Ljubavi'.

Discography

Studio albums 
 Kreni — {Studio B Session} (2015)
 Limunada (2016)

Festivals 
Pesma za Evroviziju 2022:
 Pesma ljubavi, 2022

References

External links 
 VIS Limunada's official website
 VIS Limunada on bandcamp
 VIS Limunada on Discogs

Musical groups established in 2012
Musical groups from Belgrade
Pesma za Evroviziju contestants